Johan Kristoffer Winther Skipnes (18 December 1909 –  12 March 2005) was a Norwegian politician for the Christian Democratic Party.

He was born in Aure.

He served in the position of deputy representative to the Norwegian Parliament from Møre og Romsdal during the term 1954–1957. He was later the Minister of Local Government and Work Affairs in 1972–1973 during the cabinet Korvald.

On the local level he held various positions in Molde city council from 1945 to 1975, serving as mayor during the terms 1962–1963, 1963–1965 and 1971–1973. From 1963 to 1967 he was also a member of Møre og Romsdal county council, serving as county mayor from 1963 to 1964 and in 1975.

References

1909 births
2005 deaths
People from Aure, Norway
Christian Democratic Party (Norway) politicians
Ministers of Local Government and Modernisation of Norway
Mayors of places in Møre og Romsdal
Chairmen of County Councils of Norway
Deputy members of the Storting
Place of death missing